James L. Hinson Jr. (October 29, 1952 – March 4, 2022), better known as Jimbeau Hinson, was an American country music singer-songwriter.

Hinson, along with co-writer Roy August, wrote the 1981 #1 Hot Country Songs hit, "Fancy Free", for The Oak Ridge Boys' album, Fancy Free (1981). The album was also a #1 on the Top Country Album chart and peaked at #14 on the Billboard 200. In 2010, "Fancy Free" attained the BMI 2 Million Spins Award, with over 13 years of aggregate broadcast time. Hinson wrote country hits for a number of artists, The Oak Ridge Boys, David Lee Murphy, Patty Loveless, Kathy Mattea, Brenda Lee, John Conlee, Steve Earle. Additional, artists who have recorded his songs include: Reba McEntire, Lynn Anderson, and Carol Channing.

Hinson performed as a country music from his teenage years in the late 1960s and began going by the name Jimbeau Hinson in the mid-1970s, to avoid any confusion with Muppets creator Jim Henson. Hinson signed a writing contract with The Wilburn Brothers publishing company at age seventeen and later recorded several singles for Chart Records. During the late 1970s, Hinson began a long-running relationship with The Oak Ridge Boys as a songwriter and assisted with the operations of their publishing company.  In the late 1980s he was a contestant on Star Search.

Hinson released his first album as an artist, Strong Medicine, on Wrinkled Records in 2013.

Hinson was openly bisexual, although he was in a monogamous relationship with his wife Brenda from the 1980s. He was diagnosed with HIV in 1985. He suffered a stroke in 2021, and recovered, but suffered a second stroke in early 2022. Hinson died on March 4, 2022, at the age of 70.

References

External links
 Jimbeau Hinson Web Site
 
  as Jimmy Hinson

1950s births
2022 deaths
Year of birth missing
American country singer-songwriters
American male singer-songwriters
Country musicians from Mississippi
LGBT people from Mississippi
American LGBT singers
People from Newton, Mississippi
Singer-songwriters from Mississippi